Hanková is a village and municipality in the Rožňava District in the Košice Region of middle-eastern Slovakia.

History
In historical records the village was first mentioned in 1556.

Geography
The village lies at an altitude of 490 metres and covers an area of 10.872 km².
It has a population of about 54 people.

Culture
The village has a public library and a football pitch.

Genealogical resources

The records for genealogical research are available at the state archive "Statny Archiv in Kosice, Slovakia"

 Lutheran church records (births/marriages/deaths): 1706-1949 (parish B)

See also
 List of municipalities and towns in Slovakia

External links
http://www.statistics.sk/mosmis/eng/run.html 
Surnames of living people in Hankova

Villages and municipalities in Rožňava District